Roland Juno-D is a polyphonic synthesizer introduced in 2005 by Roland Corporation. It is based on the Fantom-X series, having a vintage design that resembles the previous Juno synthesizers, such as the Juno-106. Despite having similar names and introductions, the Juno-D was not intended to be succeeded by the Juno-G synthesizer, for they were both released concurrently. A Limited Edition was released.

Features
Apart from the Juno name, the Juno-D carries distinctions from the other Juno installments, for the synthesizer has connection to Roland's RS PCM machines. The synthesizer utilizes General MIDI 2 (GM2), D-Beam control, and two optional pedal inputs. 768 Patch locations (128 user-programmable) are available for use, plus 22 Rhythm sets and 40 Performance memories. Of the preset patches, 384 are described as "Juno-D original" and 256 conform to the GM2 spec. Has 61 full size keys.

References

External links
 Roland Synth Chronicle: 1973–2014
 Roland - Roland US official site
  - Official Limited Edition Roland Page 
 Musician's Friend review for JUNO-Gi by Jim Bybee (archive.org)
 Synthblock - another review
 Juno-G details and resources at Roland Clan

Juno-D
Polyphonic synthesizers
Digital synthesizers
D-Beam